Stepan Matveevich Novichkov (29 October 1921 — 20 July 1992) was a Soviet fighter pilot during World War II. Awarded the title Hero of the Soviet Union on 4 February 1944 for his victories, by the end of the war his tally stood at an estimated 33 solo plus one shared shootdowns.

References 

1921 births
1992 deaths
Soviet World War II flying aces
Heroes of the Soviet Union
Recipients of the Order of Lenin
Recipients of the Order of the Red Banner